Nosomma monstrosum, is a hard-bodied tick of the genus Nosomma. It is found in India, Bangladesh, Sri Lanka and Vietnam.

Parasitism
It is an obligate ectoparasite of mammals require three-hosts to complete the lifecycle. Adult show peak activity in March and September. Female usually lay about 750 eggs at one time. Larvae are only known to parasitized on rats and mice, not in domestic animals. Adults are mainly found in domestic animals. It is a potential vector of Kyasanur Forest disease virus.

References

External links
A REVISION OF NOSOMMA MONSTROSUM (NUTTALL AND WARBURTON, 1908) IXODOIDEA: IXODIDAE.
A REVISION OF NOSOMMA MONSTROSUM (NUTTALL AND WARBURTON, 1908) IXODOIDEA: IXODIDAE.

Ticks